The Kurdish Democratic Party in Lebanon (Kurdish: Parti a Demoqrat a Kurdi e Lubnan; Arabic: Hizb al-Dimuqrati al-Kurdi fi Lubnan) or Parti Democratique Kurde – Liban (PDK-L) in French, is the Lebanese branch of a namesake Iraqi-based Kurdish nationalist party, established by Jamil Mihhu in 1960, and based in Lebanon. However, it was not licensed until 24 September 1970.

Mihhu supported the Iraqi government against Kurdish rebels fighting for an independent Iraqi Kurdistan and he was captured and imprisoned by the Kurdish resistance in Iraq.

Consequently, the leadership of the party passed to Jamil's son, Riyad. Another son, Muhammad, disagreed with his family's position on several issues and therefore in 1977 started his own movement, the Kurdish Democratic Party-Temporary Leadership.

The KDP-L in the Lebanese Civil War 1975–1990
When the War of the Camps broke out at Beirut in May 1985, the KDP-L joined an alliance of pro-Arafat Palestinian refugee camp militias, the Al-Mourabitoun, the Communist Action Organization in Lebanon (OCAL), and the Sixth of February Movement ('6th FM') militias against a powerful coalition that gathered their Druze allies of the  Progressive Socialist Party (PSP), and the Shia Muslim Amal movement militia forces backed by Syria, the Lebanese Army, and anti-Arafat dissident Palestinian guerrilla factions.

See also
 Al-Mourabitoun
 Lebanese Civil War
 Lebanese National Movement
 Organization of Communist Action in Lebanon (OCAL)
 People's Liberation Army (Lebanon)
 Popular Guard
 Progressive Socialist Party
 Razkari Party
 Sixth of February Movement 
 War of the Camps

References

Bibliography

 Edgar O'Ballance, Civil War in Lebanon, 1975-92, Palgrave Macmillan, London 1998. 
 Marius Deeb, The Lebanese Civil War, Praeger Publishers Inc., New York 1980. 
 William W. Harris, Faces of Lebanon: Sects, Wars, and Global Extensions, Princeton Series on the Middle East, Markus Wiener Publishers, 1997. , 1-55876-115-2

External links
Official website of the KDP - Lebanon

1960 establishments in Lebanon
Kurdish nationalist political parties
Political parties established in 1960
Political parties in Lebanon

Political parties of minorities in Lebanon